Christopher Romero, also known as "Broadway," is an American 3D animator, music video director, film director and technology entrepreneur from Fort Washington, MD, who holds a degree in imaging and digital arts from the University of Maryland. Broadway's first big break came when he produced the animated music video for deceased rapper, Big Pun's "How We Roll" single. He went on to become one of the most sought after video directors and creative director at 50 Cent's G Unit.

Broadway's talent quickly caught the attention of 50 Cent where he started producing several animated music videos and promos for 50 Cent and G Unit. In 2008, Broadway and 50 Cent created the social networking and news website, ThisIs50.com. Within a few years, ThisIs50.com has become one of the most popular websites in the World. In addition, Broadway helps 50 Cent and G Unit create several marketing campaigns. Broadway continues to help market 50 Cent, (in some instances he even tweets for 50 Cent on Twitter).

References

External links
 

Place of birth missing (living people)
Year of birth missing (living people)
Living people
University of Maryland, College Park alumni
People from Maryland
American animators
American animated film directors
American music video directors
Film directors from Maryland